Paul Robert Newton (born June 2, 1960) is am American politician and Republican member of the North Carolina State Senate, formerly representing the 36th district.

Political career
Newton was an executive at the utility company Duke Energy before retiring. As a member of the state Senate's energy committee, Newton opposed natural gas production limitations in North Carolina.

In 2021, amid nationwide Republican efforts to Republican efforts to restrict voting following the 2020 presidential election, Newton proposed legislation that would prevent counties from counting valid mail-in absentee ballots postmarked before or on election day unless they were received by the polling places by 5 p.m. on election day. Newton argued that it was "suspicious" for valid absentee ballots to be counted after election day. In the 2020 elections, 11,000 ballots arrived in the three-day grace period after election day and were counted; under Newton's proposal, they would have been thrown out.

In 2021, as co-chairman of the Senate Finance Committee, Newton sponsored a proposal to reduce the state income tax rate from 5.25% to 4.99%.

In April 2020, during the COVID-19 pandemic in North Carolina, Newton was one of five Republican state senators asked Governor Roy Cooper to allow the Coca-Cola 600, a NASCAR race, to be run at Charlotte Motor Speedway, although without a crowd of fans. The following year, Newton sponsored a "liability shield" bill to provide a limited form of immunity to businesses, government agency or nonprofit against lawsuits arising from COVID-19 transmission on their premises.

In November 2022, Newton was elected by his colleagues to become Senate Majority Leader for the 2023-2024 session.

Electoral history

2022

2020

2018

2016

References

|-

|-

  

1960 births
21st-century American politicians
Living people
Republican Party North Carolina state senators